are forms of Kanji particular to the Asahi Shimbun newspaper. Unlike Simplified Chinese, where simplifications apply to all characters, the general custom in Japanese publications is to print Jōyō/Jinmeiyō Kanji in simplified Shinjitai forms, and to print Hyōgaiji (characters outside both lists) using their original, unsimplified Kyūjitai forms. For example, the Jōyō Kanji  are printed in their Shinjitai forms  , but the Hyōgaiji  (also containing , making simplification possible) remain unsimplified.

This policy is also said to have been adopted because in the age of typewriter-based printing, more complicated Kanji could not be clearly printed. This newspaper also is currently the only publication using this simplification practice. These simplifications are not used in other publications by the Asahi Shimbun company.

Some of these Asahi simplifications have been included in the JIS X 0208 and above character sets, and even more (although lesser supported) are included in Unicode. The character   (kuzu, "arrowroot") has become a source of controversy, as only the simplified form was included in the JIS standards; the Kyūjitai form (using ) being added as a result of protest from people living in areas or with given names using this character.

See also
Extended shinjitai

Kanji
Japanese writing system terms
characters